Gwynneville is an unincorporated community in Hanover Township, Shelby County, in the U.S. state of Indiana.

History
Gwynneville was platted in 1881, and named after O'Brien Gynne, a local businessman and landowner. A post office opened at Gwynneville in 1881. Gwynneville had its own high school until the school was discontinued around 1918.

Geography

References

Unincorporated communities in Shelby County, Indiana
Unincorporated communities in Indiana
Indianapolis metropolitan area